The America East men's basketball tournament is the annual concluding tournament for the NCAA college basketball in the America East Conference. The winner of the annual tournament gains an automatic bid to the NCAA Men's Division I Basketball Championship.

Format and hosts
As of 2013, the first rounds take place at a single location, usually the home arena of one of the conference schools, but the championship game is hosted the next weekend by the higher remaining seed.  The 2013 and 2014 Tournament preliminary rounds were hosted by the University at Albany.
Beginning in 2015, the format was changed from a single location in the first rounds to multiple locations.  For every round, including the finals the higher seeded team in each game hosts.  After the first round, teams are reseeded to account for upsets that may have occurred.

Beginning with the 2018 edition, the last place team in the conference standings will not take part in the tournament. This change was made due to the impending eligibility of UMass Lowell for NCAA-sponsored postseason play, following the completion of the school's transition from NCAA Division II.

History of the tournament finals

Championships by School

†Former member of the America East

Maine, New Hampshire, UMass Lowell, and NJIT are the only remaining teams in the conference to have never won a title.

Broadcasters

Television

Radio

References

America East Championship Results

 
Recurring sporting events established in 1980